Pengxi County is a county of Sichuan Province, China, bordering Chongqing to the southeast. It is under the administration of Suining city.

Climate

References

County-level divisions of Sichuan